Senecio nigrescens is a species of the genus Senecio and family Asteraceae and was first written about in the botanical classic Botany of Beechey's Voyage to the Pacific and Behring's Straits.

References

External links

nigrescens
Flora of Chile